Lark Camp World Music, Song & Dance Celebration, originally called Lark in the Morning Music Celebration, is an American annual week-long world music and dance celebration that includes instructional workshops for professional and beginner musicians and dancers.

Lark Camp takes place in the Mendocino Woodlands State Park, near the coastal village of Mendocino, California.

There are three primary camps: 
 Camp One is focused on Irish music, Irish dance, English folk music, including English Country Dance, Morris and Sword dance, Greek music, Greek dances, Balkan music, Bulgarian dances,  and Swedish folk music, 
 Camp Two is focused on Old-time music, Square dance, Cuban music, Latin dances, Tango dance, Andean music, Galician music and dance, French folk music, and Swing dances, 
 Camp Three is focused on Middle Eastern music, Turkish music, Bellydance, Zimbabwean music, Samba Brazilian music and hand drumming.

There are also continuous jam sessions, and nightly dances for all participants.

History
Established in 1980 by Mickie Zekley, Lark Camp was created to allow traditional musicians and dancers to exchange ideas and learn.

External links
Jody Rosen. "Joanna Newsom, the Changeling", New York Times, New York, NY, March 7, 2010, about Joanna Newsom and Lark Camp.
Larry Li. "A Celtic Paradise on the California Coast", Strings Magazine, San Anselmo, CA, March 2010, about Lark Camp's Celtic music program.
Bob Doran. "Song of the Lark", North Coast - The Journal, Humboldt County, CA, August 7, 2008, about Lark Camp.
David LaHuta. "50 All-Star Family Camps", Budget Travel Magazine, New York, NY, March 2007, recommending Lark Camp as a family vacation
Claudia Kriva. "Tell Us Where To Go", Los Angeles Times, Los Angeles, CA, August 13, 2008, about Lark Camp as a non-traditional vacation.
Erin Shrader. "Plays Well with Others", All Things String, San Anselmo, CA, August 28, 2009, by a Lark Camp instructor about her experiences at music sessions at Lark Camp.
Vicki Sanders Corporon. "The Lure of Lark Camp ... I'm Singing Its Praises", The Galley from The Clan MacNeil Society, San Pleasanton, CA, Fall/Winter 2005, about a campers experiences at Lark Camp.
Marta Veiga. "Gaitas No Cerne Do Imprio", El Progreso, Lugo, Spain, April 2, 2010,about Kevin Carr and the Galacian music at Lark Camp.
Staff. "Summer Camps... Not Just For Kids Anymore", Group Trip Advisor, Glendale, AZ, 2009, about summer camps for groups traveling on a budget.
 Lark Camp website
 Lark In The Morning website

English folk dance
Contra dance
Music festivals in California
Folk festivals in the United States